Wheatley is a hamlet in the East Hampshire district of Hampshire, England.

Villages in Hampshire